Tethys Petroleum Limited is an oil and gas company active in the field of exploration and production. The company is focused on central Asia, mainly in Kazakhstan.

Listing
Tethys is a public company with its primary listing on the NEX board of the TSX Venture Exchange and is also listed on the Kazakhstan Stock Exchange (KASE).

References

External links
 

Companies formerly listed on the Toronto Stock Exchange
Oil companies of Canada
Oil companies of the United Kingdom